The 44th World Science Fiction Convention (Worldcon), also known as ConFederation, was held on 28 August–1 September 1986 at the Marriott Marquis and Atlanta Hilton in Atlanta, Georgia, United States.

The convention was co-chaired by Penny Frierson and Ron Zukowski.

Participants 

Attendance was 5,811.

Guests of Honor 

 Ray Bradbury (pro)
 Terry Carr (fan)
 Bob Shaw (toastmaster)

Awards

1986 Hugo Awards 

 Best Novel: Ender's Game by Orson Scott Card
 Best Novella: "24 Views of Mt. Fuji, by Hokusai" by Roger Zelazny
 Best Novelette: "Paladin of the Lost Hour" by Harlan Ellison
 Best Short Story: "Fermi and Frost" by Frederik Pohl
 Best Non-Fiction Book: Science Made Stupid by Tom Weller
 Best Dramatic Presentation: Back to the Future
 Best Professional Editor: (award declined by Lester del Rey in the name of the recently deceased Judy-Lynn del Rey)
 Best Professional Artist: Michael Whelan
 Best Semiprozine: Locus, edited by Charles N. Brown
 Best Fanzine: Lan's Lantern, edited by George Laskowski
 Best Fan Writer: Mike Glyer
 Best Fan Artist: Joan Hanke-Woods

Other awards 

 John W. Campbell Award for Best New Writer: Melissa Scott

See also 

 Hugo Award
 Science fiction
 Speculative fiction
 World Science Fiction Society
 Worldcon

References

External links 

 NESFA.org: The Long List
 NESFA.org: 1986 convention notes 

1986 conferences
1986 in Georgia (U.S. state)
1986 in the United States
Culture of Atlanta
Science fiction conventions in the United States
Worldcon